This article shows statistics of individual players for the football club Dinamo Zagreb It also lists all matches that Dinamo Zagreb played in the 2007–08 season.

Competitions

Overall

Prva HNL

Classification

Results summary

Results by round

Results by opponent

Source: Prva HNL 2007–08 article

UEFA Cup

Classification

Matches

Competitive

Goalscorers

External links
 Dinamo Zagreb official website

GNK Dinamo Zagreb seasons
Dinamo Zagreb
Croatian football championship-winning seasons